David Gordon Benner (born February 9, 1947) is a Canadian depth psychologist, author and teacher. The central organizing thread of his life and work has been to help people live the human journey in a deeply spiritual way and the spiritual journey in a deeply human way. Drawing on the insights of science, philosophy, the perennial wisdom tradition and forty years of work integrating psychology and spirituality, the focus of his more than thirty books has been the unfolding of the self associated with a journey of awakening and transformation, and the access this provides to wisdom. David is the Founder of Cascadia Living Wisdom where he continues to serve as a wisdom teacher and mentor, guiding people toward wholeness, alignment with the Spirit of Wisdom, and compassionate engagement with the world.

Career

David G. Benner followed his Honours BA in psychology at McMaster University with an MA and PhD in clinical psychology at York University. After registration with the College of Psychologists of Ontario, and licensing in the state of Illinois, he was certified as an expert witness in clinical psychology in both jurisdictions. He also completed post-doctoral studies at the Chicago Institute for Psychoanalysis.

His practice as a psychologist developed through clinical appointments and special projects, among them the assessment and classification of young offenders, development and evaluation of a day-treatment program for emotionally disturbed children, and an examination of the childhood antecedents of multiple personality disorder. Over the years he continued to develop therapeutic models and publish steadily.

David G. Benner was professor and founding chair, Graduate Department of Psychological Studies at Wheaton College in Illinois, and chair of the Department of Psychology, Redeemer University College, in Ancaster, Ontario. In Toronto, he held overlapping appointments as Adjunct Professor (Psychology and Christianity), St. Michael's College, University of Toronto; Adjunct Clinical Professor, Graduate Department of Psychology, York University; and Adjunct Clinical Professor, Ontario Institute for Studies in Education, University of Toronto. He was later the founding director of the Institute for Psychospiritual Health. and in 2016 he became the founding director of Cascadia Living Wisdom.

He was in private practice in Illinois and Ontario between 1973 and 2006. Whereas his clinic-based practice focused on children and adolescents, particularly those suffering from abuse and experiencing dissociative disorders, his private practice focused on adults. Within this context he developed and offered an intensive, highly individualized, short-term (3 week) residential intervention that combined clinical and spiritual components. He offered these Intensive Soul Care Retreats and trained others to do the same for over 20 years. During these years he also held clinical directorships in Glendale Heights and Carol Stream, Illinois, and served as a consultant in psychology in North Bay, Barrie and Waterloo, (Ontario, Canada), as well as for the Hershey Medical School, Pennsylvania State University (Pennsylvania), the Pastoral Counseling Institute (Atlanta), the Modum Bad Klinikken Psyckiatrisk (Norway), the Institute for Pastoral Care (Manila), the Trauma Centre for Victims of Violence and Torture (South Africa), and the Tao Fong Shan Christian Centre in Hong Kong. Other appointments included the Children in War Zones Project at McMaster University Medical School in Hamilton and Thistletown Regional Centre for Children and Adolescents in Toronto. He was also a consultant in forensic psychology to the DuPage County Circuit Court in Wheaton and Charter Barclay Hospital in Chicago.

Between 1989 and 2006, he was Chief Psychologist and Coordinator of the Brief Psychoanalytic Psychotherapy Program, Child and Adolescent Services, Hamilton, Ontario. He was Emeritus Distinguished Professor of Psychology and Spirituality at the Psychological Studies Institute, Richmont Graduate University (Atlanta, GA),
and in 2008 was named Associate Fellow at the Centre for Studies in Religion and Society, University of Victoria (Victoria, B.C.) and has lectured on four continents.

Approach
The intersection of psychology and spirituality became his main interest during the 1970s. His general approach was described as a "multidisciplinary analysis of psychological change and spiritual development" that blends "insights from psychology, theology, anthropology, his own clinical practice, and other disciplines." Examining the role of spirituality in clinical practice in 1988, he noted "the chasm that had been dug between professional psychology and spiritual longing", and in 1989, published his views in an article on the nature of spirituality, its role in psychotherapy and a "nonreductionistic understanding of spirituality that situates it within the heart of an individual's psychological being." A retrospective study of Benner's model of human nature and its implications for educators and counselors, based on his writings since the late 1980s, was published in 2006. A later examination of changes in therapeutic work over two decades included Benner among leading researchers in the field of spirituality. By then, his role in therapeutic counseling extended to spiritual guide and personal transformation coach. A 2012 review noted that "Benner's broader approach to spirituality in this book may be difficult for some readers, especially in his generous borrowing from eastern spiritualities", categorizing this as a "respectful dialog with others outside his faith tradition."

Publications
David G. Benner has authored or edited more than thirty books. Early titles focused on the role of spirituality in clinical practice and were primarily written for psychologists and other mental health professionals. His middle-phase books focused on living the spiritual journey in a deeply human way and the human journey in a deeply spiritual way, and were written from an explicitly Christian perspective. Later books have been written for a more general audience and have continued to focus on the role of spirituality in human spiritual development while drawing on science, philosophy and the perennial wisdom tradition for insights that are helpful in understanding spiritual awakening and transformation. These big themes of awakening, becoming fully human, and the possibilities of deep personal transformation have been at the core of all his books.

In addition to his books, he has also published articles in peer-reviewed journals of psychology in areas such as religious psychodynamics in multiple personality disorder, development of a psychological test for the assessment of marital communication, the psychology of money, health psychology, and psychological trauma and social healing in Croatia. He also played a seminal role in the creation of a child trauma treatment program.

He was also editor of a reference encyclopedia in psychology and co-editor of a subsequent edition expanded for a readership of pastoral counselors and clergy, as well as editor of a ten-book series on strategic pastoral counseling resources. In a journal addressing the interface of psychology and spirituality, a reviewer wrote of Benner's body of work: "His research plumbs the best of human development psychology and ancient spirituality wisdom.... As a seasoned scholar, author, psychologist and a spiritual director, Benner serves as an expert witness of what healthy and whole humans look like...." His contribution of material for peer professionals continues, and his books have reached a broad general readership. More than two dozen of his titles are in print, and translations have been published in more than twenty languages.

Awards

David G. Benner's citations and honours include being named in International Men of Achievement, The Directory of Distinguished Americans, The International Book of Honour, Dictionary of International Biography, International Directory of Distinguished Leadership, Who’s Who Among Human Service Professionals, and Who’s Who in Theology and Science.

Selected bibliography

References

Canadian academics
Canadian non-fiction writers
Canadian psychologists
People from Orillia
Writers from Ontario
1947 births
Living people
Wheaton College (Illinois) faculty